Dolno Melničani is a village in the municipality of Centar Župa, North Macedonia.

Demographics
Dolno Melničani has traditionally been inhabited by an Orthodox Macedonian and Muslim Macedonian speaking (Torbeš) population.

As of the 2021 census, Dolno Melničani had 13 residents with the following ethnic composition:
Macedonians 13

According to the 2002 census, the village had a total of 11 inhabitants. Ethnic groups in the village include:
Macedonians 11

References

Villages in Centar Župa Municipality
Macedonian Muslim villages